Mameluk was one of a dozen s built for the French Navy during the late 1930s. The ship was completed during the Battle of France in mid-1940 and her first mission was to help escort an incomplete battleship to French Morocco only days before the French signed an armistice with the Germans in June. She then helped to escort one of the battleships damaged by the British during their July attack on Mers-el-Kébir, French Algeria, back to France in November. Mameluk returned to Morocco in early 1941 for convoy-escort duties and then was transferred back to France in late 1941.

When the Germans occupied Vichy France after the Allies landed in French North Africa in November 1942 and tried to seize the French fleet intact, the destroyer was one of the ships scuttled to prevent their capture. The  (Royal Italian Navy) unsuccessfully attempted to salvage her in 1943. The ship was refloated in 1947 and subsequently scrapped.

Design and description
They were powered by two geared steam turbines, each driving one propeller shaft, using steam provided by four Sural-Penhöet forced-circulation boilers. The crew consisted of 10 officers and 177 enlisted men.

The main armament of the Le Hardi-class ships consisted of six Canon de  Modèle 1932 guns in three twin mounts, one forward and a superfiring pair aft of the superstructure. Their anti-aircraft (AA) armament consisted of one twin mount for Canon de  Modèle 1925 guns on the aft superstructure and two twin Hotchkiss  AA machine gun mounts on the roof of the shell hoists for the forward 130 mm mount. The ships carried one triple and two twin sets of  torpedo tubes; the aft mount could traverse to both sides, but the forward mounts were positioned one on each broadside. A pair of chutes were built into the stern that housed a dozen  depth charges.

Modifications
By April 1941 Mameluk had received a pair of single mounts for Browning 13.2-millimeter AA machine guns on the quarterdeck. Later that year or in early 1942 the Brownings were repositioned on platforms on the sides of the superfiring turret aft, the twin Hotchkiss machine guns were transferred to the quarterdeck, and a pair of single mounts for  Hotchkiss AA guns were installed in the former location of the Hotchkiss guns in front of the bridge.

Construction and career
Ordered on 4 May 1936, Mameluk was laid down by Ateliers et Chantiers de la Loire at their shipyard in Nantes on 1 January 1937. She was launched on 18 February 1939 and entered service on 17 June 1940. The following months saw five of the Le Hardi-class ships ordered to Oran to escort the battleship ; Mameluk arrived there on 5 November. Departing that day, they arrived at Toulon three days later after which she was placed in reserve.

The ship was transferred to Morocco for convoy escort duties on 8 May 1941 and returned to Toulon on 23 October. When the Germans attempted to capture the French ships in Toulon on 27 November 1942, Mameluk was scuttled by her crew. The Italians attempted to salvage her, but the ship was damaged by a bomb during the Allied bombing raid on 4 February 1944; sunk on 6 August 1944 by the 47th BW. She was finally refloated in 1947 and scrapped.

Notes

References

 
 

Le Hardi-class destroyers
Naval ships of France captured by Italy during World War II
1939 ships
World War II warships scuttled at Toulon
Maritime incidents in November 1942